Gösta Cederlund, Gustaf ("Gösta") Edvard Cederlund, (6 March 1888 – 4 December 1980) was a Swedish actor and film director. He was a popular character actor from the 1930s to the 1950s.

Selected filmography
 A Dangerous Wooing (1919)
 Synnöve Solbakken (1919)
 Thora van Deken (1920)
 The Mill (1921)
 A Wild Bird (1921)
 A Fortune Hunter (1921)
 The Marriage Game (1935)
 Our Boy (1936)
 The Girls of Uppakra (1936)
 Sara Learns Manners (1937)
 Conflict (1937)
 Dollar (1938)
 Art for Art's Sake (1938)
 A Woman's Face (1938)
 Comrades in Uniform (1938)
 Career (1938)
 Oh, What a Boy! (1939)
 Her Little Majesty (1939)
 Mot nya tider (1939)
 Circus (1939)
 The Two of Us (1939)
 Between Us Barons (1939)
 Wanted (1939)
 They Staked Their Lives (1940)
 Heroes in Yellow and Blue (1940)
 A Real Man (1940)
 The Three of Us (1940)
 Her Melody (1940)
 A Crime (1940)
 Fransson the Terrible (1941)
 How to Tame a Real Man (1941)
 The Yellow Clinic (1942)
 The Case of Ingegerd Bremssen (1942)
 Dangerous Ways (1942)
 The Brothers' Woman (1943)
 Kungsgatan (1943)
 Som du vill ha mej (1943)
 Torment (1944)
 Stopp! Tänk på något annat (1944)
 Motherhood (1945)
 The Serious Game (1945)
 While the Door Was Locked (1946)
 It Rains on Our Love (1946) 
 The Bells of the Old Town (1946)
 While the Door Was Locked (1946)
 Meeting in the Night (1946)
 The Sixth Commandment (1947)
 The Girl from the Marsh Croft (1947)
 Each to His Own Way (1948)
 Private Bom (1948)
 A Swedish Tiger (1948)
 Vagabond Blacksmiths (1949)
 Playing Truant (1949)
 Girl with Hyacinths (1950)
 Teacher's First Born (1950)
 Perhaps a Gentleman (1950)
 Valley of Eagles (1951)
 My Name Is Puck (1951)
 In the Arms of the Sea (1951)
 The Chieftain of Göinge (1953)
 The Road to Klockrike (1953)
 All the World's Delights (1953)
 The Red Horses (1954)
 Mord, lilla vän (1955)
 Darling of Mine (1955)
 Getting Married (1955)
 Night Light (1957)
 Woman in a Fur Coat (1958)
 Heart's Desire (1960)
 The Pleasure Garden (1961)
 A Matter of Morals (1961)

External links

1888 births
1980 deaths
Male actors from Stockholm
Swedish male film actors
Swedish male silent film actors
Swedish film directors
20th-century Swedish male actors